The Train for Venice is a 1938 French comedy film directed by André Berthomieu and starring Max Dearly, Huguette Duflos and Victor Boucher. It is based on the 1937 play of the same title written by Louis Verneuil and Georges Berr. Three years later an American adaptation of the play, My Life with Caroline, was produced starring Ronald Colman and Anna Lee.

The film's sets were designed by the art director Jean d'Eaubonne.

Cast
 Max Dearly as Chardonne
 Victor Boucher as Etienne de Boisrobert
 Huguette Duflos as Caroline Ancelot
 Claire Olivier as Suzanne
 Louis Verneuil as Michel Ancelot
 Pierre Etchepare as d'Aubigny
 Madeleine Suffel as Berthe
 Roger Vieuille as Amédée
 Georges Douking as Le barman
 Robert Ralphy as Un quémandeur
 Léon Larive as Un quémandeur

References

Bibliography
 Goble, Alan. The Complete Index to Literary Sources in Film. Walter de Gruyter, 1999.

External links

1938 films
1938 comedy films
1930s French-language films
French films based on plays
Films based on works by Louis Verneuil
Films directed by André Berthomieu
French black-and-white films
French comedy films
1930s French films